Calanticomorpha is an order of acorn barnacles in the class Thecostraca. There are 3 families and more than 90 described species in Calanticomorpha.

Families
These families and genera belong to the order Calanticomorpha:
 Order Calanticomorpha Chan et al., 2021
 Family Calanticidae Zevina, 1978
 Genus Aurivillialepas Newman, 1980
 Genus Calantica Gray, 1825
 Genus Crosnieriella Jones, 1998
 Genus Euscalpellum Hoek, 1907
 Genus Gruvelialepas Newman, 1980
 Genus Newmanilepas Zevina & Yakhontova, 1987
 Genus Paracalantica (Utinomi, 1949)
 Genus Pisiscalpellum Utinomi, 1958
 Genus Scillaelepas Seguenza, 1872
 Genus Smilium Gray, 1825
 Genus †Pachyscalpellum Buckeridge, 1991
 Genus †Zeascalpellum Buckeridge, 1983
 Family †Cretiscalpellidae Buckeridge, 1983
 Genus †Cretiscalpellum Withers, 1922
 Genus †Jagtscalpellum Gale, 2020
 Genus †Striascalpellum Gale, 2020
 Genus †Witherscalpellum Gale, 2020
 Family †Titanolepadidae Gale & Sørensen, 2015
 Genus †Ivoelepas Gale & Sørensen, 2015
 Genus †Levelepas Gale & Sørensen, 2015
 Genus †Titanolepas Withers, 1913

References

Further reading

 

Barnacles